Foreigner is the seventh studio album released by English singer-songwriter, Cat Stevens in July 1973. In addition to the minor hit "The Hurt", which received a moderate amount of airplay, Foreigner also included such songs as "100 I Dream" and the 18-minute-long "Foreigner Suite", which took up the entirety of side one.

It is the first album written and produced solely by Stevens.

In Canada, the album was ranked at #100 for its first 3 weeks before jumping to #48. It reached its peak of #5 in the 9th week, ranking #5, 5, 6, 5, 5, 6 before going down.

Background
At the pinnacle of Stevens' success with four consecutive platinum and gold albums: Mona Bone Jakon, Tea for the Tillerman, Teaser and the Firecat, and Catch Bull at Four, Stevens had a dedicated audience and fan base who wanted more. However, he himself thought his music too predictable, leaving him in a creative rut. He decided to write and produce his next album himself, surprising many others, given that Alun Davies, his close friend and first guitar in his backing band, and his producer, Paul Samwell-Smith (formerly of The Yardbirds) in particular, were instrumental in assisting Stevens to form the definitive signature sound that had brought Stevens to the height of his stardom. Seeking an alternative, he focused on the kinds of music that had begun to inspire him, which he heard on the radio: R&B music.

Bands that moved him included The Blue Notes and Stevie Wonder. Stevens came to realise that the music that he had always loved originated not as rock and roll, but what he had been introduced to as "black music". Lead Belly instantly came to mind, who had been one of his favourites. In his mind, he'd learned about "black music" almost through the back door, while also being moved toward both musicals and acoustic folk music. In deciding to drop all the musical influences in his band, he hoped to foster those early soulful sounds himself. In an interview with Circus Magazine, Stevens said: "If black music was happening, I decided to just get down to it. And because I was a stranger in the world of black sounds, I called the album Foreigner."

Stevens additionally named the album Foreigner because he took up residency in Brazil as a tax exile. He recorded Foreigner in Jamaica. On 9 November 1973, Stevens performed the song on ABC's In Concert, a 90-minute program they named the Moon & Star, including the full 18-minute "Foreigner Suite" without commercial interruption.

Although Foreigner sold well, with the album reaching No. 3 on both sides of the Atlantic, it was not favourably reviewed, and its release was not followed by a tour.

In 2009, Stevens (now known as Yusuf Islam) entered into legal proceedings alongside Joe Satriani in a lawsuit (filed in 2004 by Satriani) against the band Coldplay, alleging that they had (at least unintentionally) plagiarised respective works by both artists ("If I Could Fly" by Satriani and Stevens' "Foreigner Suite") for the melody to Coldplay's "Viva la Vida" from their Grammy Award winning album, Viva la Vida or Death and All His Friends. Yusuf added that he has forgiven Coldplay and would love to sit down and have a cup of tea with them. The section that resembles "Viva la Vida" begins at about 14:30 until the end of the 18-minute song.

Likewise, the same song segment may have unintentionally been sourced for "Hold Me 'Til the Mornin' Comes," a 1983 song from Paul Anka and Peter Cetera.

Track listing
All tracks written by Cat Stevens.

Side one
"Foreigner Suite" – 18:19

Side two
"The Hurt" – 4:18
"How Many Times" – 4:26
"Later" – 4:44
"100 I Dream" – 4:09

Personnel
Cat Stevens – vocals, piano, keyboards, acoustic guitar, synthesizer, guitar synthesizer, clavinet, RMI electric piano, string/brass/wood arrangements
Jean Roussel – keyboards, string/brass/wood arrangements
Phil Upchurch – electric guitar
Paul Martinez – bass guitar
Herbie Flowers – bass guitar on "How Many Times"
Bernard Purdie – drums, percussion
Gerry Conway – drums, percussion on "Foreigner Suite"
Patti Austin – vocals
Barbara Massey – vocals
Tasha Thomas – vocals
Tower of Power – horns

Charts

References

External links

Cat Stevens albums
1973 albums
Island Records albums
A&M Records albums
Albums with cover art by Mick Rock